Armo is a comune (municipality) in the Province of Imperia in the Italian region Liguria, located about  southwest of Genoa and about  northwest of Imperia.

Armo borders the following municipalities: Caprauna, Ormea, Pieve di Teco, and Pornassio.

References

See also 
 Rocca delle Penne

Cities and towns in Liguria
Articles which contain graphical timelines